Milena Alexeyevna Bykova (born 9 January 1998) is a Russian snowboarder. She competed in the 2018 Winter Olympics, in parallel giant slalom.

World Cup Podiums

Individual podiums
  2 wins – (2 PGS)
  3 podiums – (3 PGS)

References

External links

1998 births
Living people
Russian female snowboarders
Snowboarders at the 2018 Winter Olympics
Snowboarders at the 2022 Winter Olympics
Olympic snowboarders of Russia
Sportspeople from Ufa
Universiade gold medalists for Russia
Universiade silver medalists for Russia
Universiade medalists in snowboarding
Competitors at the 2019 Winter Universiade